Patrick O'Connor (May 6, 1909 – April 27, 1997) was an American painter. His work was part of the painting event in the art competition at the 1928 Summer Olympics.

References

1909 births
1997 deaths
French emigrants to the United States
20th-century American painters
American male painters
Olympic competitors in art competitions
Place of birth missing
20th-century American male artists